The 2011–12 season was Cesena's second consecutive season in the top division of Italian football, the Serie A. The club finished the season in 20th position, leading to its relegation to Serie B for 2012–13.

Serie A

Matches

Coppa Italia

Players

Current squad

Transfers

In

Out

References

A.C. Cesena seasons
Cesena